In computer graphics, the Loop method for subdivision surfaces is an approximating subdivision scheme developed by Charles Loop in 1987 for triangular meshes. Prior methods, namely Catmull-Clark and Doo-Sabin (1978), focused on quad meshes.

Loop subdivision surfaces are defined recursively, dividing each triangle into four smaller ones. The method is based on a quartic box spline. It generates C2 continuous limit surfaces everywhere except at extraordinary vertices, where they are C1 continuous.

Applications 
Geologists have applied Loop subdivision surfaces to model erosion on mountain faces, specifically in the Appalachians.

See also
 Geodesic polyhedron
Catmull-Clark subdivision surface
Doo-Sabin subdivision surface

References 
 Charles Loop: Smooth Subdivision Surfaces Based on Triangles, M.S. Mathematics thesis, University of Utah, 1987 (pdf).
 Jos Stam: Evaluation of Loop Subdivision Surfaces, Computer Graphics Proceedings ACM SIGGRAPH 1998, (pdf, downloadable eigenstructures).
 Antony Pugh, Polyhedra: a visual approach, 1976, Chapter 6. The Geodesic Polyhedra of R. Buckminster Fuller and Related Polyhedra

External links 
 Homepage of Charles Loop.

3D computer graphics
Multivariate interpolation